Dacoderus is a genus of narrow-waisted bark beetles in the family Salpingidae. There are about seven described species in Dacoderus.

Species
These seven species belong to the genus Dacoderus:
 Dacoderus acanthomma Blair, 1918
 Dacoderus laevipennis Horn, 1893
 Dacoderus rossi Aalbu, Andrews & Pollock, 2005
 Dacoderus sleeperi Aalbu, Andrews & Pollock, 2005
 Dacoderus steineri Aalbu, Andrews & Pollock, 2005
 Dacoderus striaticeps LeConte, 1858
 Dacoderus werneri Aalbu, Andrews & Pollock, 2005

References

Further reading

 

Salpingidae
Articles created by Qbugbot